Fazlur Rahman (1905–1966) was a Bengali politician and lawyer. He was the first Education Minister of Pakistan and a member of the 1st and 2nd National Assemblies of Pakistan.

Early life and education 
Fazlur Rahman was born in 1905, to an Urdu-speaking Bengali Muslim family in the village of Shinepukur, Dohar, Dhaka. He studied at Bharga High School and later obtained a Master of Arts degree in history in 1929. In 1933, he earned a BL degree.

Career 
After completing his education, Fazlur Rahman initially started in the law sector but participated in social work and politics. During this period, he was a part of the Bengal Provincial Muslim League's Working Committee as well as the All-India Muslim League's Central Committee. In 1937, he was elected as a member of the Bengal Legislative Assembly for Dacca. The Council appointed him as Chief Whip in 1943. In 1946, Fazlur Rahman became the Revenue Minister of Bengal and was re-elected into the Bengal Legislative Council.

After the independence of Pakistan in 1947, he became a member of the country's first National Assembly and served in Liaquat Ali Khan's central cabinet in the Ministry of Interior, Information & Broadcasting, Education, Rehabilitation, Industries, Commerce and Works. At that time, he lived at The Anchorage in Kutchery Road, Karachi. He served in the former two ministries during Khwaja Nazimuddin's cabinet too in the early 1950s.

Fazlur Rahman represented the Dhaka University constituency at the 1954 East Bengal Legislative Assembly election as a Muslim League candidate. However in 1955, he became an independent politician when the East Pakistan Provincial Assembly elected him to be a Member of the 2nd National Assembly of Pakistan. He used to live in 15 Mary Road, Karachi some time in this period. When I. I. Chundrigar became the Prime Minister of Pakistan, Fazlur Rahman was the Minister of Commerce, Finance and Law. Ayub Khan enforced the Elected Bodies Disqualification Order upon many politicians including Fazlur Rahman. This disqualified Fazlur Rahman from partaking in politics for five years, and led to Fazlur Rahman's retirement.

Views 
Fazlur Rahman recognised the importance of education and history. Prior to independence, he was a member of the University of Calcutta's executive council and the Royal Asiatic Society of Bengal. He became the president of Pakistan Historical Society after independence, and was a long-time member of the Dhaka University Court.

His popularity declined with the rise of the Bengali language movement as he supported Urdu as Pakistan's national language and suggested replacement of the Bengali alphabet for the Perso-Arabic script.

Family 
Fazlur Rahman had two sons, Ahmed Sohail Fasihur Rahman and Salman F Rahman, with his wife Syeda Fatina, who was a descendant of the Dewan family of Haibatnagar from her father's side.

Death 
Fazlur Rahman died in 1966.

References 

1905 births
1966 deaths
Pakistani MNAs 1955–1958
All Pakistan Muslim League politicians
People of East Pakistan
People from Dhaka District
20th-century Bengalis
20th-century Muslims
Urdu-speaking Bangladeshi
Bengal MLAs 1937–1945
Members of the Constituent Assembly of Pakistan